Kaytetye (also spelt Kaititj, Gaididj, Kaiditj, Kaytej) is an Australian Aboriginal language spoken in the Northern Territory north of Alice Springs by the Kaytetye people, who live around Barrow Creek and Tennant Creek. It belongs to the Arandic subgroup of the Pama-Nyungan languages and is related to Alyawarra, which is one of the Upper Arrernte dialects. It has an unusual phonology and there are no known dialects.

The language is considered to be threatened; it is used for face-to-face communication within all generations, but it is losing users, with only 109 speakers of the language in the 2021 census.

The Kaytetye have (or had) a well-developed sign language known as Akitiri or Eltye eltyarrenke.

Phonology
Kaytetye is phonologically unusual in a number of ways. Words start with vowels and end with schwa; full CV(C) syllables only occur within a word, as in the word  'three' (schwa is spelled , unless initial, in which case it is not written and often not pronounced). Stress falls on the first full syllable. There are only two productive vowels, but numerous consonants, including pre-stopped and pre-palatalized consonants.

Consonants
Consonants occur plain and labialized. 

 is phonemically . In the orthography,  is written .

Vowels

 is marginal. 

Two-vowel systems are unusual, but occur in closely related Arrernte as well as in some Northwest Caucasian languages. It seems that the vowel system derives from an earlier one with the typical Australian , but that *u lost its roundedness to neighboring consonants, resulting in the labialized series of consonants, while *i lost its frontness (palatal-ness) to other consonants as well, resulting in some cases in the prepalatalized series.

Grammar
Kin terms are obligatorily possessed, though with grammatically singular pronouns. There is a dyadic suffix as well:

Dual and plural pronouns distinguish clusivity  as well as moiety (or 'section') and generation. That is, for a male speaker, different pronouns are used for I and my sibling, grandparent, grandchild (even generation, same moiety), I and my father, I and my brother's child (odd generation, same moiety), and I and my mother, spouse, sister's child (opposite moiety). This results in twelve pronouns for 'we':

That is, root ay-, dual suffix -la or plural -na, exclusive infix , an irregular nasal for even generation, and a suffix for same moiety -ke or opposite moiety -nthe.

Verbs include incorporated former verbs of motion that indicate direction and relative timing of someone, usually the subject of the verb. There are differences depending on whether the verb is transitive or intransitive:

People
 Erlikilyika (Jim Kite) learnt to speak Kaytetye when working on the Overland Telegraph Line, and worked as an interpreter for anthropologists and explorers Spencer and Gillen.

References

Further reading 
 (pp.59-62 are specifically on Kaytetye)
 Materials on Kaytetye are included in the open access Arthur Capell collections (AC1) held by Paradisec.
  Has map and gives much info about Arrernte group and related languages.

Arandic languages
Indigenous Australian languages in the Northern Territory
Endangered indigenous Australian languages in the Northern Territory
Vertical vowel systems